Angus Alexander Wall (born March 15, 1967) is a film editor and film title designer.  He and fellow film editor Kirk Baxter won the Academy Award for Best Film Editing for the David Fincher film The Social Network (2010) and again the next year for The Girl with the Dragon Tattoo (2011). He and Baxter were nominated the Academy Award for Best Film Editing, the BAFTA Award for Best Editing, and the American Cinema Editors Eddie Award for the 2008 film The Curious Case of Benjamin Button, also directed by David Fincher. Wall's title design work on the HBO television series Carnivàle and Game of Thrones both received Emmy Awards in 2004 and 2011, respectively, and his work on the series Romes titles was nominated for the BAFTA Award in 2005.

Life and career
Wall graduated from Woodberry Forest School in Virginia in 1984. He then earned a BA from Bowdoin College in 1988. In 1992, he and Linda Carlson started the firm Rock Paper Scissors, which has become "a respected West Hollywood creative editorial house known for its commercial work for such clients as BMW, HP, and Nike."

Wall's relationship with the director David Fincher extends back to 1988, when Wall entered the entertainment industry. Wall had edited some commercials directed by David Fincher, and he edited the titles for Fincher's film Se7en. He became an "editorial consultant" on  Fight Club (1999), which was edited by James Haygood, and he then co-edited Panic Room (2002) with Haygood. While Wall became the sole editor credited on Zodiac (2007), Kirk Baxter worked with him as an "additional editor". Wall proposed to Fincher that Baxter be the co-editor for The Curious Case of Benjamin Button.

Wall and his firm are noted for being early adopters of all-digital filmmaking using digital cameras. The film Zodiac (2007), which was directed by Fincher and edited by Wall, is noted as "the first major motion picture created without using film or tape," although some parts of the film were shot with conventional cameras. One important aspect of using digital cameras is that the director can view a scene immediately after it is recorded; as Fincher commented in an interview, "Dailies almost always end up being disappointing, like the veil is pierced and you look at it for the first time and think, 'Oh my god, this is what I really have to work with.' But when you can see what you have as it's gathered, it can be a much less neurotic process." Digital filmmaking also creates new possibilities for film editing compared to the "cutting" of reels of physical film; among these possibilities are subtle changes in the timing of an actor's performance, and combining of two different takes of a given scene within a single frame. The Curious Case of Benjamin Button has the additional novel element that the facial performances in many of the film's scenes were recorded independently of the body performances, and were combined to create the final film. Brad Pitt's face performances for Button were used in all the scenes, but for many of the scenes a second actor's performance was used for the rest of Button's body.

Filmography (as editor)

References

External links
.

1967 births
American film editors
Best Editing BAFTA Award winners
Best Film Editing Academy Award winners
Bowdoin College alumni
Living people
Woodberry Forest School alumni